Moscow is an unincorporated community in Kemper County, Mississippi. It lies along State Highway 493 southwest of the city of De Kalb, the county seat of Kemper County.  Its elevation is 509 feet (155 m). A post office operated under the name Moscow from 1871 to 1922. In 1900, Moscow's population was 30.

References

Unincorporated communities in Kemper County, Mississippi
Unincorporated communities in Mississippi